Count Károly Reviczky de Revisnye (4 November 1737 – 10 August 1793), also known as Charles de Reviczky, was a Hungarian nobleman, bibliophile and orientalist. He was eminent for his classical taste and erudition.

Biography
Reviczky was born in Revišné in 1737, present day Slovakia. He served as Envoy Extraordinary from the emperor of Hungary to the King of Great Britain, and as Austrian Minister at Florence.

With great judgment and at a considerable expense, he collected a classical library, which he sold during his residence in London to George Spencer, 2nd Earl Spencer of Althorp. The purchase included an annuity for Reviczky's life, and it formed the basis of Spencer's collection. It has likewise the following French title, . Prefixed to the work (which consists of about 300 pages) is a letter of ten pages, in French, addressed to M. L'A. D**** (M. l'Abbé Denina).

Reviczky was made a Commander of the Order of St. Stephen. He died at Vienna in August 1793.

References

1737 births
1793 deaths
Hungarian nobility
Hungarian orientalists
Bibliophiles
Knights Commander of the Order of Saint Stephen of Hungary
Austro-Hungarian diplomats